The 1925 Butler Bulldogs football team was an American football team that represented Butler University as an independent during the 1925 college football season. In its sixth and final season under head coach Harlan Page, the team compiled a 5–2–2 record and shut out five of nine opponents. The team played its home games at Irwin Field  in Indianapolis.

Schedule

References

Butler
Butler Bulldogs football seasons
Butler Bulldogs football